Santiago Cid Harguindey (1944 – 4 June 2021) was a Spanish politician.

Biography
Harguindey co-founded the football club Verín CF in 1971. In the 1983 election, he became Mayor of Verín after gaining support from the Galician Coalition. In 1987, he was re-elected with support from the Centrists of Galicia. In 1990, he was charged with prevarication and was ousted in a no-confidence vote on 17 October 1991.

Santiago Cid Harguindey died on 4 June 2021 at the age of 76.

References

1944 births
2021 deaths
Mayors of places in Galicia
Union of the Democratic Centre (Spain) politicians
Spanish sports executives and administrators
People from the Province of Ourense